Giorgi Dzneladze (born 30 August 1968 in Tsulukidze, now Khoni) is a retired Georgian professional football player.

Dzneladze played in the Russian Premier League with FC Krylia Sovetov Samara.

External links
Profile at Footballfacts.ru

1968 births
Living people
Soviet footballers
Footballers from Georgia (country)
Expatriate footballers from Georgia (country)
Expatriate footballers in Russia
Expatriate footballers in Bangladesh
Russian Premier League players
PFC Krylia Sovetov Samara players
FC Sokol Saratov players
Abahani Limited (Dhaka) players
Association football defenders
FC Torpedo NN Nizhny Novgorod players
FC Lokomotivi Tbilisi players
FC Guria Lanchkhuti players
FC Shevardeni-1906 Tbilisi players
FC Sioni Bolnisi players